Antonio Cardile (1914–1986) was an Italian painter belonging to the modern movement of the Scuola romana (Roman School of Painting).

Biography
Cardile was born in Taranto, but in 1925 moved with his family to Florence. Graduating from the Accademia di Belle Arti Firenze with Felice Carena and  the engraver Celestino Celestini, he initially exhibited at the Mostre Sindacali. During World War II, after a painful war imprisonment, he returned to Rome where he immediately joined the Roman School of Painting. In the last years of his life, he introduced his nephew Joseph Pace to the figurative arts.

Giovanni Omiccioli describes the artist in this way:

Corrado Cagli said of him:

From 1936 Cardile is present with significant one-man shows to the Palazzo Pitti in Florence, Palazzo delle Esposizioni in Rome and in the most prestigious Roman galleries, such as "La Tartaruga", and took part in meaningful group expositions with Pirandello, Guttuso, De Chirico, Luigi Capogrossi, Domenico Purificato, Giulio Turcato, Salvatore Greco. Winner of numerous awards, his work is present in public institutions.

He continued to work in Rome until his death in 1986.

Notes

Bibliography 
 2009 — Equitazione & Ambiente Arte, Antonio Cardile, by Joseph Pace Filtranisme — Rome, Italy
 2008 — Joseph Pace: L'irremovibilità della memoria, by Mariastella Margozzi, Centro d'Arte La Bitta, Rome, Italy
 2006 — Quattrocchi su Roma, Antonio Cardile, Artiste della Scuola Romana, by Marcello Paris e Joseph Pace Filtranisme — Rome, Italy
 1955 — Bollettino La Tartaruga, by Corrado Cagli — Rome, Italy
 1955 — Bollettino La Tartaruga, by Giovanni Omiccioli — Rome, Italy
 1951 — Antonio Cardile, by Carlo Innamorati, Rome, Italy

External links
  Official Web Site
  Pinacoteca di Cesena
  Pinacoteca di Cesena
  Antonio Cardile, Wikipedia IT
  VI Quadriennale Nazionale d'Arte di Roma - 1951

1914 births
1986 deaths
Painters from Rome
20th-century Italian painters
Italian male painters
People from Taranto
20th-century Italian male artists